is a manga written and illustrated by Ryoko Mitsuki. The manga's first tankōbon volume was released by SoftBank Creative on June 30, 2008. It was licensed in North America by Tokyopop.

Plot
 

Twin sisters Mizeria and Clarissa Rezelput are Harmonizers, able to manipulate the harmonies that exist in all living things. Confined to a locked garden, they have been raised by their guardian Rikhter Eintetta, trained and guided by his nurturing hand. The girls eagerly await their 16th birthday, practicing for their coming of age ceremony, when they will finally be recognized as true Harmonizers. With the passing of the ceremony, they will also gain new freedoms, and finally be able to leave their garden. However, when dark forces interfere during the ceremony, not only are Mizeria's dreams of freedom are destroyed and her sister kidnapped by turned-traitor Rikhter - the fate of the entire world is now at stake.

Release

Three manga volumes of Doors of Chaos were originally released in Japan. The first was released on June 30, 2008, and concluded with the third volume that was released on February 2, 2009. Tokyopop released the first two volumes in North America but folded before the third volume could be released. The manga was also licensed in France by Soleil, in Finland by Pauna Media Group, in Hungary by Mangattack, in Czech Republic as Dveře chaosu by Zoner Press in Russia as Двери Хаоса by Eksmo & Comix-ART, and in Brazil by NewPop.

Reception
IGN's A.E. Sparrow criticizes the manga for occasionally using modern language, which doesn't fit the time period of the manga. Pop Culture Shock's Katherine Dacey criticizes the artist for putting too much detail into the manga's artwork. Pop Syndicate's Amanda Rush commended the manga for its "beautiful" artwork.

References

External links
Doors of Chaos at Tokyopop's website—it is no longer available on this website.

Shōjo manga
2008 manga
Fantasy anime and manga
Tokyopop titles